Pleiogynium is a genus of flowering plant of the family Anacardiaceae. It was defined by German botanist Adolf Engler in 1883. The Burdekin plum (P. timoriense) is a notable member.

Species
Pleiogynium cerasiferum
Pleiogynium hapalum
Pleiogynium papuanum
Pleiogynium solandri
Pleiogynium timoriense

References

External links

Anacardiaceae
Sapindales of Australia
Anacardiaceae genera